Vishal Mishra is an Indian music composer and singer. He first appeared in a reality show aired on DD National. In his initial days in the music industry, Mishra was guided by Lalit Pandit, of the Jatin–Lalit composer duo.

Mishra made his debut as a composer in 2016 with the Tamil film Devi. In 2017, he composed the song "Jaane De", by Atif Aslam, featured on the soundtrack of Qarib Qarib Singlle. Mishra also composed songs for Munna Michael, which marked his singing debut, and the Marathi film FU: Friendship Unlimited. He composed the "Rafta Rafta" medley for Yamla Pagla Deewana Phir Se, marking his first project of 2018. 

His music video features Khan in a special appearance; Mishra subsequently composed the romantic song "Selfish", written by and starring Khan for the action film Race 3, while also composing the title track of Veere Di Wedding, starring Kareena Kapoor Khan, Sonam Kapoor, Swara Bhasker and Shikha Talsania.

Mishra's first act as a solo composer for songs and score, came with the Salman Khan-produced romantic drama Notebook. He rose to fame with the hit song "Kaise Hua" from Kabir Singh. He then produced a soundtrack for the Anurag Kashyap-produced Saand Ki Aankh, a biopic on the lives of the Shooter Dadis.

In 2020 Mishra released "Manjha", a song featuring Aayush Sharma and Saiee Manjrekar. Akshay Kumar and Jackky Bhagnani were also involved in the composition of the song "Phir Muskurayega India", which featured Bollywood actors Kumar and Bhagnani.

Early life
Mishra was born in Unnao, Uttar Pradesh. He was educated in Lucknow.

Discography

Accolades

References 

Indian male singer-songwriters
Indian singer-songwriters
Living people
21st-century Indian singers
21st-century Indian male singers
People from Unnao
1991 births